Skeleton Crew is a collection of short fiction by American writer Stephen King, published by Putnam in June 1985. A limited edition of a thousand copies was published by Scream/Press in October 1985, illustrated by J. K. Potter, containing an additional short story, "The Revelations of 'Becka Paulson", which had originally appeared in Rolling Stone magazine (July 19 – August 2, 1984), and was later incorporated into King's 1987 novel The Tommyknockers. The original title of this book was Night Moves.

Stories collected

Overview
The collection features 22 works, which includes eighteen short stories, two novellas (The Mist and The Ballad of The Flexible Bullet), and two poems ("Paranoid: A Chant" and "For Owen"). In addition to the introduction, in which King directly addresses his readers in his signature conversational style, Skeleton Crew features an epilogue of sorts entitled "Notes" wherein King discusses the origins of several stories in the collection. The stories are collected from science-fiction and horror anthologies (Dark Forces, Shadows, Terrors, and New Terrors), genre magazine publications (Twilight Zone, Ellery Queen's Mystery Magazine, Startling Mystery Stories, Weirdbook and Fantasy and Science Fiction), and popular magazines (Redbook, Gallery, Yankee and Playboy).

Although published in 1985, the stories collected in Skeleton Crew span seventeen years from "The Reaper's Image" (King's second professional sale when he was just eighteen years old) to The Ballad of The Flexible Bullet which was completed in 1983.

The collection also features some more personal works, including "For Owen", the poem he wrote for his son, and "Gramma" a horrific tale from an eleven-year-old boy's perspective that seems to recall King's own horrors living with his invalid grandmother.

Of one of the stories in the collection, King says: "As far as short stories are concerned, I like the grisly ones the best. However the story "Survivor Type" goes a little bit too far, even for me."

Adaptations

Film and television

"The Raft" was adapted as a segment of the 1987 New World Pictures anthology film Creepshow 2, with a script by George A. Romero, and directed by Michael Gornic.

"Word Processor of the Gods"  (1984 Laurel TV, directed by Michael Gornic) was a 22-minute episode of Tales from the Darkside.

"Gramma" was adapted into an episode of the 1985 iteration of The Twilight Zone, written by Harlan Ellison. In 2014, it was loosely adapted into a film called Mercy, starring Chandler Riggs and Dylan McDermott.

The Mist was adapted into the film The Mist (2007 The Weinstein Company, written and directed by Frank Darabont), which was released on November 21, 2007; it was later adapted as a 2017 Spike TV series.

"Survivor Type" was adapted as an animated segment for a special episode of the 2019 Creepshow TV series.

"The Jaunt" will be made into a feature film by production company Plan B Entertainment, with Andy Muschietti set to direct.

Dollar Baby adaptations

The following stories have been adapted as Dollar Baby short films:

Here There Be Tygers (1988), by Guy Maddin
Cain Rose Up (1989), by David C. Spillers
Paranoid (2000), by Jay Holben
Here There Be Tygers (2003), by James Cochrane
The Jaunt (2007), by Todd Gorman
Survivor Type (2011), by Chris Ethridge and Jayson Palmer
 The Reaper's Image (2013) by Sammy Bates
 The Man Who Would Not Shake Hands (2022) by Nicholas Bromund

Other media adaptations
The Mist was adapted as a 90-minute full-cast audio recording in 1986 in "3-D Sound" from ZBS Productions, released by Simon & Schuster, Inc.

In 1985, the American Library Association issued a series of posters that featured celebrities  encouraging Americans to patronize their local libraries. In one of these, Michael J. Fox holds a copy of Skeleton Crew while a skeletal  hand rests on his shoulder.

Reception
Neil Gaiman reviewed Skeleton Crew for Imagine magazine, and described it as "500 pages of gorious goodies."

Skeleton Crew is critically held as showing King as a maturing writer with greater breadth and depth than his previous short works.

Reviews
Review by Faren Miller (1985) in Locus, #291 April 1985
Review by Michael R. Collings (1985) in Fantasy Review, June 1985
Review by Doc Kennedy (1985) in Rod Serling's The Twilight Zone Magazine, July-August 1985
Review by Don D'Ammassa (1985) in Science Fiction Chronicle, #73 October 1985
Review by Algis Budrys (1985) in The Magazine of Fantasy & Science Fiction, November 1985
Review by David Pringle (1985) in Interzone, #13 Autumn 1985
Review by Roz Kaveney (1985) in Foundation, #34 Autumn 1985
Review by Darrell Schweitzer (1986) in Science Fiction Review, Spring 1986
Review by Andy Sawyer (1986) in Paperback Inferno, #63

See also

Dollar Baby

References

1985 short story collections
American short story collections
Short story collections by Stephen King
G. P. Putnam's Sons books